Renato Cecchetto (28 October 1951 – 23 January 2022) was an Italian actor who specialized in dubbing.

Life and career
In the 1970s, Cecchetto attended the Silvio d'Amico National Academy of Dramatic Arts and began his career working with film directors like Mario Monicelli and Carlo Vanzina. However, he was best known for being a voice actor: he gave his voice to Shrek in the Shrek franchise and to nearly all the Disney Pixar characters originally voiced by John Ratzenberger, including Hamm from the Toy Story film series. Starting from season 12, Cecchetto became the new Italian voice of Cleveland Brown on Family Guy, replacing Luciano Marchitiello.

He died from complications following a scooter accident at the San Camillo Hospital in Rome on 23 January 2022, at the age of 70.

Filmography
 
 Fracchia la belva umana (1981)
 I fichissimi (1981)
 La gorilla (1982)
 The Pool Hustlers (1982)
 All My Friends Part 2 (1982)
 Pierino colpisce ancora (1982)
 Story of Piera (1983)
 Il tenente dei carabinieri (1986)
 Fantozzi alla riscossa (1990)
 Parenti serpenti (1992)

Dubbing roles

Animation
 Shrek in Shrek
 Shrek in Shrek 2
 Shrek in Shrek the Third
 Shrek in Shrek Forever After
 Hamm in Toy Story
 Hamm in Toy Story 2
 Hamm in Toy Story 3
 Hamm in Toy Story 4
 Hamm in Buzz Lightyear of Star Command: The Adventure Begins
 Hamm in Hawaiian Vacation
 Hamm in Small Fry
 Hamm in Partysaurus Rex
 P.T. Flea in A Bug's Life
 The Abominable Snowman in Monsters, Inc.
 The Abominable Snowman in Monsters University
 School of Moonfish in Finding Nemo
 Mack in Cars
 Mack in Cars 2
 Mack in Cars 3
 Mustafa in Ratatouille
 John in WALL-E
 Tom in Up
 Fritz in Inside Out
 Earl in The Good Dinosaur
 Bill in Finding Dory
 Juan Ortodoncia in Coco
 Cleveland Brown in Family Guy (season 12-19)
 Uncle Max in The Lion King 1½
 Mr. Trout in The Boxtrolls
 Razaq in The Breadwinner
 Mr. Ellingboe in Klaus
 Meow Meow Fuzzyface in BoJack Horseman

Live action
 Sid Garner in The Hangover
 Sid Garner in The Hangover Part II 
 Sid Garner in The Hangover Part III
 Thomas Tipp in Vanilla Sky
 Detective Doyle in The Mask
 Pauly in Darkman
 Buck Russell in Uncle Buck
 Smith in Problem Child 2
 Maurice Woodruff in The Life and Death of Peter Sellers
 Matsui in Ocean's Twelve

References

External links
 
 
 

1951 births
2022 deaths
Accademia Nazionale di Arte Drammatica Silvio D'Amico alumni
Italian male film actors
Italian male radio actors
Italian male television actors
Italian male voice actors
Italian voice directors
People from Adria
Road incident deaths in Italy
20th-century Italian male actors
21st-century Italian male actors